Branden Ore (born February 17, 1986 in Norfolk, Virginia) is a former college football running back for West Liberty University.  He had originally declared for the 2008 NFL Draft, but subsequently withdrew his name.

Ore began his college career as a redshirt freshman in 2005 at Virginia Tech behind Mike Imoh and Cedric Humes on the depth chart.  Following the season, Ore underwent shoulder surgery and spent the spring semester rehabbing in Chesapeake.  Working for a 7-Eleven warehouse, Ore refocused himself mentally.

Ore started every game his sophomore year and rushed for 1,090 yards and 14 touchdowns in the Hokies' 10-win 2006 season.

On March 19, 2008 Virginia Tech coach Frank Beamer, announced that the redshirt-senior from Chesapeake, Virginia would no longer be a member of the Hokie football team. Beamer wished Ore well in his future endeavors and indicated that there would be no further comment on the matter.  Ore became the starting tailback for the West Liberty Hilltoppers where he says that the secluded environment helped to resolve his disciplinary issues.

References

External links
Virginia Tech Hokies bio

1986 births
Living people
American football running backs
Virginia Tech Hokies football players
West Liberty Hilltoppers football players
Players of American football from Norfolk, Virginia